This is about the locality in Stockholm County. For the district on Hisingen, see Lindholmen, Gothenburg, for the island in Karlskrona, see Lindholmen, Karlskrona

Lindholmen is a locality situated in Vallentuna Municipality, Stockholm County, Sweden with 860 inhabitants in 2010.

References 

Populated places in Vallentuna Municipality